Waruingi Kimani (born 23 November 1962) is a Kenyan wrestler. He competed in the men's freestyle 57 kg at the 1988 Summer Olympics.

References

1962 births
Living people
Kenyan male sport wrestlers
Olympic wrestlers of Kenya
Wrestlers at the 1988 Summer Olympics
Place of birth missing (living people)
20th-century Kenyan people